Yao Sui 姚燧 (1238–1313), writer of Chinese Sanqu poetry and official, was the nephew of the noted official Yao Shu 姚樞 (1203–1280) and uncle of the dramatist and sanqu poet Yao Shouzhong 姚守中. At three he was orphaned. He was raised by his uncle Yao Shu. He began his studies with the scholar Xu Heng. At age twenty four he began his study of the Tang period prose masters and shortly thereafter began his thirty-year career as an official, eventually becoming a member of the Hanlin Academy and various other appointments.  He began work on the Veritable Records of Kublai Khan. The family had roots in the Manchurian province of Liaoning and subsequently relocated to Luoyang 洛陽 in Henan 河南 province. His formal collected writings of fifty chapters has survived, as well as a small collection of his sanqu lyrics, and other writings.

UNTITLED

Sky’s winds and sea’s tides.

Men of the past have likewise been here.

Saints of wine, wizards of verse.

I climbed to gaze out.

Sun is far, heaven is high.

Mountains join water, vast and obscure.

Waters join sky, remote and mysterious.

Through with making a name for myself,

I laugh and chant verse;

Haven’t waited for any old monk to invite me!

UNTITLED

Things grow, things fall;

I lie on my bed at midnight.

All about me are puppets on stage;

Man’s life, unreal; like a bubble.

Who in the mist of danger

Finds light?

UNTITLED

Beneath my writing brush

Themes of wind and moon pass by.

Before my eyes

The number of my children increases and increases.

People ask me, “How goes it.”

I tell them

The sea of men is vast;

Not a day without shifts

In life’s winds and waves.

UNTITLED

To the passionate Mr. Wang she sent a note:

“Tonight let’s meet for love;

Be sure to be there.”

She waited until the wife was asleep.

Softly she tapped outside his window.

References 

Hu Qiaomu ed., The Great Encyclopedia of China, Chinese Literature, vol. 2, Beijing-Shanghai, 1986, p. 1153.

Lu Weifen ed., Complete Yuan Period Sanqu Lyrics, Liaoning, 2000, vol. 1, pp. 177–185.

Ma Liangchun　and Li Futian ed., The Great Encyclopedia of Chinese Literature, Tianlu, 1991, vol. 6, p. 4627.

Carpenter, Bruce E. 'Chinese San-ch’ü Poetry of the Mongol Era: I', Tezukayama Daigaku kiyo (Journal of Tezukayama University), Nara, Japan, no. 22, pp. 40–41.

Yuan dynasty poets
1238 births
1313 deaths
Politicians from Luoyang
Poets from Henan
Yuan dynasty politicians
Writers from Luoyang